The 2004 World Series Lights season was contested over eight race weekends with 16 races. In this one-make formula all drivers had to use the Dallara chassis (Dallara WSL3) and Nissan engines (Nissan AER). Five different teams and eleven drivers competed with the titles going to Serbian driver Miloš Pavlović and Italian team Vergani Racing.

Teams and drivers
All teams used the Dallara WSL3 chassis and Nissan AER engines.

Race calendar and results

Championship standings

Final points standings
For every race the points were awarded: 15 points to the winner, 12 for runner-up, 10 for third place, 8 for fourth place, 6 for fifth place, winding down to 1 point for 10th place. Lower placed drivers did not award points. Additional points were awarded to the driver setting the fastest race lap (2 points). The best 12 race results count, but all additional points count. Four drivers had a point deduction, which are given in tooltips.

 Points System:

{|
|

Only in race 1 all points were awarded — in all other races not all points were awarded (not enough competitors).

References

External links

Renault Sport Series seasons
World Series by Nissan
World Series Lights